Maciej Kalkowski (born 18 July 1974) is a Polish retired footballer who played as a midfielder. He started and finished his professional playing career with Lechia Gdańsk. The majority of his playing career was spent at teams in the Pomeranian region, with the exception of GKS Bełchatów and Stomil Olsztyn.

Career
Kalkowski started his career with his local team Lechia Gdańsk, making his debut for the team in May 1993. His first stint with Lechia was not successful, with the team experiencing two relegations and having to play with the Lechia second team during the failed Olimpia-Lechia Gdańsk merger. In 1997 with Lechia Gdańsk experiencing difficulties as a club he moved to GKS Bełchatów. In his first season with Bełchatów the team won promotion to the first division after winning the II liga. The team were relegated the season after, and Kalkowski left after the team failed to win promotion back to the I liga at the first attempt. After his move to Bełchatów, he returned to Pomerania and had short spells with Arka Gdynia, Chojniczanka Chojnice and Unia Tczew, before leaving the region again to play for Stomil Olsztyn for a season, before once more returning to play with Arka Gdynia. During his short stints Kalkowski accomplished little, and only leaving Stomil Olsztyn after they were demoted from the second tier to the fifth tier. In 2004 he returned to Lechia Gdańsk, who were when he joined, playing in the fourth tier. He joined Lechia during their rise up the leagues, winning the IV liga, III liga, and II liga, playing for Lechia in the Ekstraklasa in 2008. He played his final season for the Lechia first team during the 2008–09 season. And retired from professional football in 2010 after spending his final season with the Lechia II team helping them to win their division. He had a brief spell in management with Cartusia Kartuzy from 2010 to 2011. After his professional career he spent time playing with Portowiec Gdańsk from 2011 until 2014 while holding various coaching roles with Lechia Gdańsk since 2011.

Honours
GKS Bełchatów
II liga: 1997–98

Lechia Gdańsk
II liga: 2007–08
III liga (group II): 2004–05
IV liga (pomeranian group): 2003–04

Lechia Gdańsk II
IV liga (pomeranian group): 2009–10

References

1974 births
Living people
Polish footballers
Association football midfielders
Sportspeople from Gdańsk
Sportspeople from Pomeranian Voivodeship
Lechia Gdańsk players
Lechia Gdańsk II players
Unia Tczew players
Arka Gdynia players
OKS Stomil Olsztyn players
Chojniczanka Chojnice players
GKS Bełchatów players
Ekstraklasa players
I liga players
Polish football managers
Lechia Gdańsk managers
Ekstraklasa managers